Perur Chettipalayam is a village Panchayat of Thondamuthur Panchayat Union in Coimbatore District. Perur Chettipalayam is 7 km southwest from Coimbatore City. This is located next to Perur in Gandhipuram-Kovaiputhur road. In Coimbatore there are many Chettipalayam like Ramachettipalayam, Chettipalayam near mathukkarai, So the name Perur Chettipalayam is derived from the place is located next to Perur.

Demographic
In Perur Chettipalayam village Panchayat Total population has 17809. Of which 8,891 are males  while 8,918 are females as per report released by Census India 2011.   Tamil language is a primary speaking language. Some peoples are speaking Telugu language. Agriculture work and agri related work is main occupation. Rest of people are working for salary base   and kooli.

Sub Villages

Chettipalayam 
Arumugam Goundanur
Pachapalayam

Important place
Kaliyamman Kovil
Perur Chettipalayam lake
Ground for Wednesday Market
Coimbatore Aavin
singanur amman Temple arumugagoundanur 
 veeramathi amman Temple arumugagoundanur

References

Villages in Coimbatore district